Harrisonville High School is a public high school located in Harrisonville, Missouri. It serves students in grades 9 through 12 and is the only high school in the Harrisonville R-IX School District.

History
Harrisonville High graduated its first class in 1888.

Academics
HHS offers Advanced Placement classes. About a quarter of students take AP courses.

Athletics
Harrisonville athletic teams are nicknamed the Wildcats and compete in the Missouri River Valley Conference West.

Sports at Harrisonville High School include:
(Fall) girls’ golf, girls’ tennis, softball, boys’ soccer, cross country, cheer, and dance
(Winter) girls’ basketball, boys’ basketball, girls’ wrestling, boys’ wrestling, cheer, and dance
(Spring) boys’ golf, boys’ tennis, baseball, girls’ soccer, and track

Performing arts
Harrisonville has two competitive show choirs, "Music Makers" and "Forefront". The program also hosts an annual competition.

The school also has a competitive dance team, the "Silver Sensations".

Notable alumni
Brutus Hamilton, pentathlete and decathlete

External links

References

Public high schools in Missouri
Schools in Cass County, Missouri